Tomer Heymann (born October 12, 1970 in Kfar Yedidia, Israel) is an  Israeli  filmmaker. He is best known for his work on the documentary films Paper Dolls, Mr.Gaga and Who's Gonna Love Me Now?.

Career 
Heymann has directed many documentary films and series in the past ten years, most of them long-term follow-ups and personal documentations. His films won major awards at different prestigious film festivals including his first film It Kinda Scares Me. Paper Dolls won three awards at the 2006 Berlin International Film Festival and the audience’s award at the Los Angeles Film Festival. The film and TV series Bridge over the Wadi, co-produced with the American ITVS, won the Israeli Documentary Film competition, participated in IDFA Festival's prestigious competition and won many awards around the world. Tomer's new 8-part series The Way Home was recently broadcast by the Yes Doco Channel in Israel and won the best documentary series award at the 2009 Jerusalem International Film Festival. I Shot My Love premiered at Berlin Int'l Film Festival in 2010, won the Best Mid-length Award at Hotdocs and was screened in major film festival including: Dok/Fest Sheffield, Taiwan Int'l Documentary Film Festival, Kassel Film Festival and more. The 2016 documentary Who's Gonna Love Me Now?, directed by Tomer and his brother Barak Heymann, explores the life of Saar, a gay HIV-positive Israeli man living in London whom Tomer met in Tel Aviv in 1994.

Filmography 
 2000 - Laugh Till I Cry - 45 min
 2001 - It Kinda Scares Me - 57 min
 2003 - Aviv-F*****-up Generation - Documentary 35mm, 60 min
 2004 - Paper Dolls - 6-part series
 2005 - Bridge Over the Wadi - 4-part series
 2006 - Cinderellas - 4-part series
 2006 - Paper Dolls - 35 mm, 80 min
 2006 - Bridge Over The Wadi - 55 min
 2007 - Debut - Hofaat Bechora - 5-part series
 2007 - Out of Focus - 52 min
 2007 - Black Over White - 50 min
 2009 - The Way Home - 8-part series
 2010 - I Shot My Love – 56/70 min
 2015 - Mr. Gaga - 100 min
 2016 - Who's Gonna Love Me Now?
 2019 - Jonathan Agassi Saved My Life

Films Festivals and awards
 I Shot My Love - Warsaw Jewish Film Festival
Paper Dolls - Jewish Motifs International Film Festival
Jonathan Agassi Saved My Life -  Warsaw Golden Phoenix at Jewish Motifs International Film Festival (2019)

References

External links 
 
 nytimes.com

Israeli film directors
Israeli twins
Living people
1970 births
Israeli gay men
LGBT film directors
LGBT television directors
20th-century Israeli LGBT people
21st-century Israeli LGBT people